Xi Enting ( 1946 – 27 October 2019) was a male table tennis player from China.

Xi was born in 1946 in Tangshan, Hebei, Republic of China. He trained at Baoding Amateur Sports School and entered the Chinese National Table Tennis Team at age 19.

From 1971 to 1975, Xi won four medals in singles, doubles, and team events in the World Table Tennis Championships and several medals in the Asian Table Tennis Championships.

The four world medals included two gold medals in the men's team event at the 1971 World Table Tennis Championships and the men's singles at the 1973 World Table Tennis Championships.

Xi died from thoracic aortic rupture on 27 October 2019, aged 73.

See also
 List of table tennis players
 List of World Table Tennis Championships medalists

References

1946 births
2019 deaths
Chinese male table tennis players
Asian Games medalists in table tennis
Table tennis players at the 1974 Asian Games
Table tennis players from Baoding
Medalists at the 1974 Asian Games
Asian Games gold medalists for China
Asian Games bronze medalists for China
Sportspeople from Tangshan